Sagar may refer to:

Places and jurisdictions

India 
 Sagar, Madhya Pradesh, a city in Madhya Pradesh state of central India
 Sagar district, an administrative unit headquartered in the city
 Sagar division, an administrative unit headquartered in the city
 Sagar railway station
 Sagar (Lok Sabha constituency) (Indian federal parliament)
 Sagar (Madhya Pradesh Vidhan Sabha constituency) (state parliament)
 Syro-Malabar Catholic Eparchy of Sagar (Eastern Catholic diocese, Chaldean=Syro-oriental rite)
 Sagar University
 Sagar Island, also known as Ganga Sagar, pilgrimage centre in West Bengal about 150 km south of Kolkata
 Sagar Port
 Sagar Mahavidyalaya
 Sagar (community development block)
 Sagar (West Bengal Vidhan Sabha constituency)
 Sagara, Karnataka, a city in Shimoga district, Karnataka, India
Sagar (Vidhana Sabha constituency)
 Sagar, Yadgir district, a village in Yadgir district, Karnataka, India

Europe 
 Zagor or 
 Deutsch Sagar, the old German name of the village Nowy Zagór, Dąbie, Lubusz Voivodeship, Poland

Arts and fiction
 Sagar (film), a 2012 Kannada film
 Sagar Films, also known as Sagar Arts, Indian film company
 Sagar Alias Jacky, a character in Malayalam films
 Sagar, a fictional planet where the 1981 animated TV series Blackstar takes place

People 
 Sagar (caste)
 Sagar (name)

Other uses 
 Sagar v Ridehalgh & Sons Ltd, a 1931 UK labour law case
 Sagar Mala project, an initiative by the government of India to enhance the performance of the country's logistics sector
 Security and Growth for All in the Region (SAGAR)
 Cyclone Sagar, a 2018 cyclone which affected the Horn of Africa

See also 
 Himayat Sagar, an artificial lake near Hyderabad, Telangana, India
 Hussain Sagar, an artificial lake in Hyderabad, Telangana, India
 Saagar (disambiguation)
 Saggar, a ceramic boxlike container used in the firing of pottery
 Saghar (disambiguation)
 Saga (disambiguation)
 Sagara (disambiguation)